The Emergency Public Warning System was a system used in the province of Alberta, Canada until October 2011, whereby local or provincial authorities could warn the public about impending or current emergencies affecting their area. The system was replaced by the Alberta Emergency Alert but is still in use by the provinces Ontario and British Columbia. The system was proposed by the provincial government after an F4 tornado ripped through Edmonton, Alberta on July 31, 1987, killing 27 people and causing millions of dollars in damage.

The EPWS could be activated by local police, fire, and environmental agencies; by Environment Canada; and by other provincial and local authorities as required. It could be activated for any of the following reasons:

Severe weather
Flood
Wildfire
Hazardous material release
Terrorist threat
Water contamination
AMBER Alert
Other threats to life, property and safety.

The EPWS was originally operated by the CKUA Radio Network, but was later operated by Black Coral Inc., a private company headquartered in Ottawa, Ontario. It was rebroadcast through various television and radio stations and cable systems provincewide.

References

External links 
 Emergency Public Warning System Website at CKUA Radio via the Internet Archive as of May 2008
 EPWS Website at the Government of Alberta via the Internet Archive as of December 2011

Civil defense
Emergency population warning systems in Canada
2011 disestablishments in Alberta